|}

The Prix Bertrand du Breuil is a Group 3 flat horse race in France open to thoroughbreds aged four years or older. It is run at Chantilly over a distance of 1,600 metres (about 1 mile), and it is scheduled to take place each year in June.

History
The earliest version of the event was established at Chantilly in 1852. Its prize money was originally provided by the Chemin de Fer du Nord, a railway company in northern France and the race was titled the Prix de Chemin du Fer du Nord. The first running was a 1,200-metre flat race for two-year-olds, and in the following years it was a 2,400-metre event over hurdles. It reverted to being a flat race in 1856, when it became a 3,200-metre contest for horses aged three or older.

The Chemin de Fer du Nord continued to provide the total prize money until 1910. Thereafter, it contributed a partial amount each year until 1937. The funding discontinued when the regional railways merged to form the SNCF.

The present Prix du Chemin de Fer du Nord was created in 1933, when its distance was cut to 1,400 metres. It was cancelled in 1940, and for the next two years it was held at Longchamp. It was run at Maisons-Laffitte in 1943, and was cancelled again in 1944. Another spell at Longchamp began in 1945.

The race was extended to 1,700 metres in 1950. It returned to Chantilly and reverted to 1,400 metres in 1955. The minimum age was raised to four in 1967, and the distance was increased to 1,600 metres in 1972.

The event was staged at Maisons-Laffitte in 1997 and 1998, and its current period at Chantilly began in 1999. It is now held on the same day as the Prix de Diane.

In 2013 the race was renamed in memory of Bertrand du Breuil (1926–2011), the last president of the Societe d'Encouragemment, forerunner of France Galop.

Records
Most successful horse (2 wins):
 Menetrier – 1948, 1949
 Spirito del Vento – 2007, 2008

Leading jockey (7 wins):
 Freddy Head – Apataki (1966), Regent Street (1969), My Friend Paul (1973), Rostov (1980), Big John (1982), Pluralisme (1984), Pink (1985)

Leading trainer (7 wins):
 André Fabre – Mill Native (1988), French Stress (1989), Kingsalsa (2000), Cacique (2005), Apsis (2006), Byword (2011), Fintry (2015)

Leading owner (4 wins):
 Khalid Abdullah – Cacique (2005), Apsis (2006), Byword (2011). Mainsail (2013)

Winners since 1981

Earlier winners

 1933: Dickens
 1934: Rodosto
 1935: Rarity
 1936: Le Cyclone
 1937: Republique
 1938: Mandoline
 1939: Earnest
 1940: no race
 1941: Thread
 1942: Balthazar / Panipat *
 1943: Fine Art
 1944: no race
 1945: Tango
 1946: Vagabond
 1947: Thiercelin
 1948: Menetrier
 1949: Menetrier
 1950: Eppi d'Or
 1951: Commando
 1952: Norman
 1953: Voltaire
 1954: Fine Top
 1955: Soleil Royal
 1956:
 1957: Renard
 1958:
 1959:
 1960: Rina
 1961: Galant Gaditan
 1962: Cassis
 1963: Hodell
 1964: Nandou
 1965: Present
 1966: Apataki
 1967: Village Square
 1968: Calife
 1969: Regent Street
 1970: Irish Minstrel
 1971: Joshua
 1972: Etoile Lointaine
 1973: My Friend Paul
 1974: Ace of Aces
 1975: Son of Silver
 1976: Full of Hope
 1977: Mittainvilliers
 1978: Mad Captain
 1979: Fils Prodigue
 1980: Rostov

* The 1942 race was a dead-heat and has joint winners.

See also
 List of French flat horse races

References
 France Galop / Racing Post:
 france-galop.com – A Brief History: Prix du Chemin de Fer du Nord.
 galop.courses-france.com – Prix du Chemin de Fer du Nord – Palmarès depuis 1980.
 galopp-sieger.de – Prix du Chemin de Fer du Nord.
 horseracingintfed.com – International Federation of Horseracing Authorities – Race Detail (2016).
 pedigreequery.com – Prix du Chemin de Fer du Nord – Chantilly.

Open mile category horse races
Chantilly Racecourse
Horse races in France
Recurring sporting events established in 1852
1852 establishments in France